Szegedi Atlétikai Klub or shortly Szegedi AK was a Hungarian football club from the town of Szeged, Hungary.

History
Szegedi AK debuted in the 1926–27 season of the Hungarian League and finished in seventh place. The team played 22 seasons in the top flight until 1951. In 1976 the club was merged into Szegedi EAC.

Names
 1899–1926: Szegedi Atlétikai Klub (SZAK)
 1926–1931: Bástya FC
 1931–1944: Szeged FC
 1945–1949: Szegedi Atlétikai Klub (SZAK)
 1949–1950: Szegedi MTE
 1950–1957: Szegedi Petőfi
 1957–1976: Szegedi Atlétikai Klub (SZAK)

Honours
Hungarian Cup:
 Runner-up (1) :1929–30

References

Football clubs in Hungary
1899 establishments in Hungary
Sport in Szeged